Paul Wilbur Manns (June 18, 1910 – March 16, 1978) was an American newspaperman and politician who served in both houses of the Virginia General Assembly. First elected to the Senate in 1965, he served until his death in 1978. At the time, he was chairman of the Senate transportation committee.

References

External links 
 
 

1910 births
1978 deaths
Democratic Party Virginia state senators
20th-century American politicians